Haw Branch is a stream in Daviess County in the U.S. state of Missouri.

Haw Branch most likely was named for the black haw timber along its course.

See also
List of rivers of Missouri

References

Rivers of Daviess County, Missouri
Rivers of Missouri